Charles Ruxton (1726–1806) was an Irish MP and landowner in Ardee, County Louth.

A younger son of William Ruxton, he and his elder brother John Ruxton represented Ardee in the Irish House of Commons. 

He married Elizabeth, daughter and heiress of Robert Parkinson, who had also been an MP for Ardee. They inherited his estate of the Red House, Ardee, which on Ruxton's death passed to their son William Parkinson Ruxton.

References

 https://web.archive.org/web/20120212070428/http://www.dhs.kyutech.ac.jp/~ruxton/ruxtons_of_ardee.html
 https://web.archive.org/web/20090601105535/http://www.leighrayment.com/commons/irelandcommons.htm

1726 births
1806 deaths
People from County Louth
Politicians from County Louth
Irish MPs 1798–1800
Irish MPs 1761–1768
Irish MPs 1783–1790
Members of the Parliament of Ireland (pre-1801) for County Louth constituencies
People from Ardee